The Belle Album is the 12th studio album by soul musician Al Green. It is his first album recorded without longtime producer Willie Mitchell, owner of Green's former label, Hi Records. With Mitchell and his label Green also abandoned the famed Hi Rhythm Section, which had previously played a large part in defining Green's distinctive musical style. This also marks the first instance in which Green plays lead guitar on his records.

The Belle Album is one of the last in a string of secular recordings made by Green; he had recently converted to Christianity and had been ordained as a pastor, and thereafter he began creating gospel records exclusively.

Critical reception 

Reviewing the album for The Village Voice, Robert Christgau wrote in January 1978:

The following month, Greil Marcus reviewed the album in Rolling Stone. "In rock & roll, nothing seems easier or more obvious than a good beat, but nothing is more elusive", Marcus wrote. "We may someday look back on The Belle Album as Al Green's best — it's too soon to know; the man has a lifetime ahead of him — and if we do, the beat will be the reason. Whether or not the seemingly effortless religious conviction of the songs Green has written for this record lasts as long as he does, the beat will never wear out." In 1989, Spin ranked The Belle Album as the 16th greatest record of all time.

In 1998, The Wire included The Belle Album in their list of "100 Records That Set the World on Fire (While No One Was Listening)", where the staff described it as "[a] pivotal record for Green, launched from somewhere between Memphis and Valhalla", that fused pop sensibilities with "Pentecostal fire" and which provided "the last gasp of soul passion before the adolescent cool of the post-Jimmy Carter years suffocated the US." They felt that even for 1977's recording standards, the album "sounded like a field recording, especially with Green playing his own lead guitar. But it had real down home power."

Track listing
All songs written by Al Green, Fred Jordan and Reuben Fairfax, Jr.

Side one
"Belle" – 4:50
"Loving You" – 3:32
"Feels Like Summer" – 3:42
"Georgia Boy" – 7:01

Side two
"I Feel Good" – 5:20
"All N All" – 3:39
"Chariots of Fire" – 3:50
"Dream" – 7:33

Personnel
Al Green – vocals, acoustic and electric guitar
Reuben Fairfax, Jr. – bass guitar, bell lyre
James Bass – electric guitar
Margaret Foxworth, Linda Jones, Harvey Jones – background vocals
 Purvis Leon Thomas – clavinet, Fender Rhodes piano
Johnny Brown – acoustic piano, Fender Rhodes piano
Fred Jordan – Fender Rhodes piano, Roland String Ensemble, Polyphonic Orchestration, trumpet, flugelhorn
John Toney – drums, Syndrum
Rob Payne – Syndrum
Ardis Hardin – drums
Buddy Jarrett – alto sax
Darryl Neely – trumpet, flugelhorn
Ron Echols – tenor and baritone sax

References

External links 
 The Belle Album at AcclaimedMusic
 The Belle Album at Discogs

Belle Album, The
Belle Album, The
Hi Records albums